Rhod Gilbert's Bulging Barrel of Laughs is a 6-part radio show on BBC Radio 2 hosted by comedian Rhod Gilbert. The show is co-hosted by Greg Davies and Lloyd Langford with support from Sarah Millican. Each week the 1 hour show contains a mix of stand up comedy from the regular cast and a guest comedian. There is also a musical act that play numerous songs throughout the show.

Series 1 (2010)

Features

Each week in the Rhod's Rant Club feature, Gilbert tells the listener in his irritable style how some part of the modern world annoys him. Greg's Indecent Proposal sees Davies offer an either/or question to the other presenters. Confessions sees Gilbert read emails and talk to the audience/presenters on the topic of his choice where the aim is to reveal embarrassing anecdotes involving the topic. It's a setup where Gilbert gives Davies and Langford a punchline and they have to suggest a setup to create a working joke against the clock. Rhod's Chin Strokers where Gilbert announces a topic for discussion and debate. Lloyd's Concierge Service where Langford answers agony aunt style questions.

References

External links

BBC Radio comedy programmes
BBC Radio 2 programmes